Ali Abdullah Harib Al-Habsi (born 30 December 1981) is an Omani retired professional footballer who played as a goalkeeper.

Club career

Early career
Al-Habsi was born in Oman and started his early career in the country, racking up appearances before his move.

Bolton Wanderers
His transfer from Lyn Oslo to Bolton Wanderers in January 2006 was a transfer highlighted in the Stevens inquiry report, in June 2007. The report expressed concerns because of the apparent conflict of interest between agent Craig Allardyce, his father Sam Allardyce – and the club itself.

Al-Habsi did not make any first team appearances in his first year at Bolton. Al-Habsi made his full Bolton debut in the 2–1 extra time League Cup victory over Fulham in September 2007.

Al-Habsi then went on to make a further 15 appearances during the course of the 2007–08 season, most notably his performance against Bayern Munich in the UEFA Cup against whom he produced several good saves against the star-studded German team. He made his first Premier League start against Wigan Athletic. In December 2008, he was rewarded for his work with an extension to his contract until 2013. Despite this, Al-Habsi lost his place when Jussi Jääskeläinen returned from injury.

Wigan Athletic (loan)

In July 2010, Al-Habsi joined local rivals Wigan Athletic on a season-long loan. He made his debut on 24 August 2010 in a League Cup match against Hartlepool United and made his League debut four days later against Tottenham Hotspur. He was named Wigan's player of the season for the 2010–11 season.

Wigan Athletic
On 4 July 2011 Al-Habsi joined the club permanently, signing a four-year contract for an estimated £4 million transfer fee from Bolton.
Al-Habsi established himself as an outstanding penalty saver, saving approximately 50% of all the penalties he faced since joining Wigan. Robin van Persie, Carlos Tevez, Javier Hernández and Mikel Arteta are among the penalty takers Al-Habsi has stopped. This earned him links to Liverpool and Arsenal. During the back end of the 2012–13 season, Al-Habsi was dropped to the bench as his position as Wigan's number one was threatened by the arrival of the athletic, young Spaniard Joel Robles on loan. Al-Habsi started Wigan's FA Cup semi-final win over Millwall but was on the bench for the final itself. Shortly after the final Wigan were relegated back to the championship.

Brighton & Hove Albion (loan)
On 31 October 2014, Al-Habsi signed for fellow Championship side Brighton & Hove Albion on a one-month loan. After playing only one game for the club, Al-Habsi returned to his parent club Wigan.

Reading
Following his release from Wigan Athletic, Al-Habsi went on trial with Reading in July 2015. This ended in Al-Habsi signing a two-year contract with the club on 14 July 2015. On 5 January 2017, Al-Habsi extended his contract with Reading until the end of the 2018–19 season.

On 17 March 2017, Al-Habsi made several crucial saves in a 2–0 victory against playoff rivals Sheffield Wednesday. This performance and others throughout the season saw Al-Habsi named in the EFL Championship team of the season and awarded the Reading player of the season award.

Al-Hilal
On 17 July 2017, Al-Habsi moved to Al-Hilal for an undisclosed fee, signing a three-year contract.

West Bromwich Albion
On 29 August 2019, Al-Habsi moved to Championship side West Bromwich Albion on a free transfer, signing a deal until the end of the season with the West Midlands club. Al-Habsi was released by the club in June 2020 without having made an appearance for the club. West Brom manager Slaven Bilić stated that he had been keen to extend Al-Habsi's contract until the end of the delayed 2019–20 season, but this was not pursued as he had returned to his native Oman and would have to undertake a two-week quarantine period before rejoining the squad.

Retirement
On 21 August 2020, Al-Habsi announced his retirement.

International career
Al-Habsi began playing in his native country Oman at the age of seventeen, and joined the ranks of the Oman under-19s squad, before he was spotted by John Burridge in 2001. Due to the difficulty of securing a work permit, he was unable to move to Europe at this early stage of his career.

He was called up for Oman, and played in all of their three group matches at the 2004 AFC Asian Cup in China and also made four appearances for the team in their qualifying campaign for the 2006 FIFA World Cup, which they exited in the first group stage after finishing second in a group with Japan, India and Singapore. He was also Oman's first-choice goalkeeper at the 2007 AFC Asian Cup, appearing in all of their three group matches.

Al-Habsi also has appeared as main keeper in four consecutive Arabian Gulf Cups. In each tournament he earned the award for best goalkeeper, most recently at the 19th Arabian Gulf Cup. He kept a clean sheet throughout the 2009 tournament that Oman eventually won. He earned his 100th cap with Oman in a 0–4 loss to Australia in 2015 AFC Asian Cup.

On 5 January 2020, Al-Habsi announced his retirement from international football.

Personal life
Al-Habsi is a practising Muslim and says that his faith plays a big part in his life. He is also married and has three daughters.

After finishing high school, he was a fireman in the Seeb International Airport in Muscat. In an interview with Al-Jazeera Sports, Al-Habsi accredited his previous profession with teaching him patience, hard work and patriotism. In another interview with AMF, he says that if he had not played professional football, he would have most likely continued with being a fireman.

Al-Habsi is the co-founder of Safety First, a non-profit road safety organisation in Oman that seeks to decrease car accident fatalities in the country.

Career statistics

Club

Notes

International

Honours

Club
Lyn Oslo
Norwegian Football Cup: Runners-up 2004

Wigan Athletic
FA Cup: 2012–13

Al Hilal
 Saudi Professional League: 2017–18
 Saudi Super Cup: 2018

Oman
Arabian Gulf Cup: 2009; Runner-up: 2004, 2007

Individual
 Best Goalkeeper of the Gulf Cup: 2003, 2004, 2007, 2009, 2011
 Arab Goalkeeper of the Year: 2004
 Norwegian Goalkeeper of the Year: 2004
 Wigan Athletic Player of the Year: 2010–11
 Nominated for the Best at Sport award at the British Muslim Awards: 2015
 Reading FC Player of the Year: 2015–16, 2016–17

See also
 List of footballers with 100 or more caps

References

External links

1981 births
Living people
People from Muscat, Oman
Omani footballers
Omani expatriate footballers
Oman international footballers
Omani expatriate sportspeople in England
Omani expatriate sportspeople in Norway
Omani Muslims
Association football goalkeepers
Al-Nasr SC (Salalah) players
Lyn Fotball players
Bolton Wanderers F.C. players
Wigan Athletic F.C. players
Brighton & Hove Albion F.C. players
Reading F.C. players
Eliteserien players
Premier League players
Expatriate footballers in England
Expatriate footballers in Norway
2004 AFC Asian Cup players
2007 AFC Asian Cup players
2015 AFC Asian Cup players
Kniksen Award winners
FIFA Century Club
Footballers at the 2002 Asian Games
Al Hilal SFC players
Saudi Professional League players
English Football League players
Asian Games competitors for Oman
Omani expatriate sportspeople in Saudi Arabia
Expatriate footballers in Saudi Arabia